is a Japanese professional sumo wrestler from Kurayoshi, Tottori. After a successful amateur career, he turned professional in January 2023, via makushita tsukedashi, winning the division's championship. His highest rank has been Juryo 14 which was achieved in March 2023. He wrestles for Miyagino stable whose oyakata is former Yokozuna Hakuhō Shō.

Early life and sumo background
Ochiai began to wrestle regularly when he was in his fourth year of primary school. He entered Tottori Jōhoku High School and won the title of high school yokozuna  in his second and third year of high school competition; in his third year, he was in the top eight at the All-Japan Championships and thus was eligible for sandanme tsukedashi. After graduating from high school, he focused on healing his shoulder injury and worked at his father's metalwork machinery company Noda Gumi in Tottori. By virtue of winning the All Japan Corporate Sumo Championship in September 2022 (and thus being named Corporate Yokozuna) he was eligible to enter professional sumo as makushita tsukedashi.

Career
At the invitation of Miyagino oyakata (the 69th yokozuna Hakuhō), Ochiai joined the Miyagino stable. He made his professional debut in January 2023 at the rank of makushita 15 to reflect his amateur success (makushita tsukedashi). He won the makushita title with an undefeated record of seven wins and was subsequently promoted to the jūryō division for March, becoming the first wrestler to earn a jūryō promotion after just one tournament in 90 years. Given Ochiai's quick rise to the second-highest division, Miyagino confessed he hadn't had the time to think of a shikona for his apprentice. Thanks to his record-breaking promotion, Ochiai began to be nicknamed , meaning 'Reiwa monster', in reference to ōzeki Musōyama who was nicknamed 'Heisei monster' after he too was promoted to jūryō after being undefeated as a makushita. Ochiai experienced his first defeat in professional sumo on day 2 of the Osaka tournament (in March 2023) against the other newly promoted jūryō, .

Career record

See also
Glossary of sumo terms
List of active sumo wrestlers

References

External links 

Sumo people from Tottori Prefecture
2003 births
Living people
Japanese sumo wrestlers
Sumo wrestlers who use their birth name